{{DISPLAYTITLE:Iota2 Muscae}}

ι2 Muscae, Latinised as Iota2 Muscae, is a blue-white-hued star in the southern constellation Musca, near the souther constellation border with Chamaeleon. It has an apparent visual magnitude of 6.62, which is just below the normal limit of stellar brightness visible to the naked eye. It is a member of the Hyades Stream, but is not part of the Hyades or Praesepe open clusters.

This is a B-type main-sequence star with a stellar classification of B9V. It has a high rate of spin, showing a projected rotational velocity of 116 km/s.

References

B-type main-sequence stars
Hyades Stream

Musca (constellation)
Muscae, Iota2
Durchmusterung objects
116579
065628
5051